The Fairchild Channel F is a home video game console released by Fairchild Camera and Instrument in November 1976. It has the distinction of being the first programmable ROM cartridge–based video game console, and the first console to use a microprocessor. It was launched as the Fairchild Video Entertainment System, or Fairchild VES for short, but when Atari released their Atari Video Computer System, Atari VCS, later Atari 2600 the next year, Fairchild renamed its machine.

Twenty-six cartridges, termed 'Videocarts', were officially released to consumers during the ownership of Fairchild and Zircon, the first twenty-one of which were released by Fairchild. Several of these cartridges were capable of playing more than one game and were typically priced at $19.95. The Videocarts were yellow and approximately the size and overall texture of an 8 track cartridge. They usually featured colorful label artwork. The earlier artwork was created by nationally known artist Tom Kamifuji and art directed by Nick Talesfore. The console contained two built-in games, Tennis and Hockey, which were both advanced Pong clones. In Hockey the reflecting bar could be changed to diagonals by twisting the controller, and could move all over the playing field. Tennis was much like the original Pong. These games were reviewed by Video magazine in 1978 and Hockey received a score of 7 out of 10 while Tennis received a 6 out of 10.

A sales brochure from 1978 listed 'Keyboard Videocarts' for sale. The three shown were K-1 Casino Poker, K-2 Space Odyssey, and K-3 Pro-Football. These were intended to use the Keyboard accessory. All further brochures, released after Zircon took over Fairchild, never listed this accessory nor anything called a Keyboard Videocart.

There was one additional cartridge released numbered Videocart-51 and simply titled 'Demo 1'. This Videocart was shown in a single sales brochure released shortly after Zircon acquired the company. It was never listed for sale after this single brochure which was used for winter of 1979.

Videocarts

Videocart-1
Videocart-1: Tic Tac Toe, Shooting Gallery, Doodle, Quadradoodle is a board game genre video game released in 1976 by Fairchild. Video magazine reviewed the individual games in a 1978 article on the Channel F, scoring Tic-Tac-Toe a 5 out of 10, Shooting Gallery a 7 out of 10, Doodle a 4 out of 10, and Quadra-Doodle a 3 out of 10. Shooting Gallery was described as "challenging" and Doodle was characterized as "not really a game" and was criticized for its difficulty of control.

Videocart-2
Videocart-2: Desert Fox, Shooting Gallery was released in 1976 by Fairchild. Video magazine reviewed the individual games in 1978, describing Desert Fox as "challenging" while scoring it an 8 out of 10, and noting that Shooting Gallery is the same game as on Videocart-1 while re-scoring it a 7 out of 10.

Videocart-3
Videocart 3: Video Blackjack is a Casino video game released in 1976 by Fairchild. Video magazine reviewed the game in 1978, describing it as "adult entertainment" and scoring it a 10 out of 10. Video Games praised Casino Royale (Video Blackjack) in 1983, calling it "the best card game, from blackjack to bridge, made for any TV-game system" and a reason to buy the Channel F after its discontinuation.

Videocart-4
Videocart-4: Spitfire is a one-on-one aerial dogfighting Shooter game released by Fairchild in 1977. In addition to a two-player mode, the game allowed for one player to combat the CPU, which for the time was unique for a home console owing to the Channel F being the first home console with a CPU. Video magazine reviewed the game in 1978, scoring it a 6 out of 10 and describing it as "exciting" but noting that "sometimes it's hard to tell if your plane is flying upside down."

Videocart-5
Videocart-5: Space War is a Shoot 'em up released by Fairchild in 1977. Video magazine reviewed the game in 1978, scoring it a 9 out of 10 and describing it as "exciting" and "fast-moving" with "energetic sound effects". Video Games in 1983 unfavorably reviewed Space War, calling it perhaps "the most antiquated game of its type still on the market".

Videocart-6
Videocart-6: Math Quiz (Addition & Subtraction) is a Trivia/game Show video game released in 1977 by Fairchild. Video magazine reviewed the individual games in 1978, scoring Math Quiz - Addition and Math Quiz - Subtraction a 2 out of 10 each. The games were criticized for exceptionally poor controls and handling.

Videocart-7
Videocart-7: Math Quiz (Multiplication & Division) is a Trivia/game Show video game released in 1977 by Fairchild.

Videocart-8
Videocart-8: Mind Reader, Nim (also referred to as Magic Numbers) is a trivia/game show video game released in 1977 by Fairchild. Video magazine reviewed the individual games in 1978, scoring Magic Numbers a 9 out of 10 and declining to award a score for Nim. Whereas Magic Numbers was described as tricky but exciting (especially in "timing mode"), Nim was found be the reviewers to be incomprehensible. After "over an hour" of attempts to play and a telephone call to Fairchild the reviewers gave up trying.

Videocart-9
Videocart 9: Drag Strip is a racing video game released in 1976 by Fairchild. Video magazine reviewed the game in 1978, scoring it a 5 out of 10 and criticizing its controls/handling and its low level of difficulty but noting that "the sound effects are fun".

Videocart-10
Videocart-10: Maze, Cat and Mouse is a puzzle video game released in 1977 by Fairchild.

Videocart-11
Videocart-11: Backgammon, Acey-Deucey is a board game genre video game released in 1977 by Fairchild.

Videocart-12
Videocart-12: Baseball is a sports video game released in 1977 by Fairchild. The first console baseball game featured an innovative pitching interface that would become a cornerstone for future titles based on the sport. Twisting the controllers steers the pitch, while pushing forward or pulling back varies its speed. If a batter manages to hit the pitch, four fielders can be moved to the left or right to make an out. Strikeouts, walks, and getting hit by the pitch are all possible. The intricacies of the batter/pitcher contest made this game, much like real baseball, a game that came down to pitching. The game was reviewed by Video magazine in 1978 where it received a score of 10 out of 10.

Videocart-13
Videocart 13: Robot War/Torpedo Alley is a 2D platformer released in 1977 by Fairchild. Video Games in 1983 described Robot War as one of the best Channel F games, calling it "Berzerk without guns".

Videocart-14
Videocart-14: Sonar Search is an action video game released in 1977 by Fairchild.

Videocart-15
Videocart-15: Memory Match is a puzzle video game released in 1976 by Fairchild.

Videocart-16
Videocart-16: Dodge-It is a sports video game released in 1978 by Fairchild. The game is similar to dodge ball. One or two players controls a character represented by a square in a room on the screen. A ball controlled by the computer is then introduced into the room. Overtime more balls are introduced into the room. The objective is to not come in contact with the balls controlled by the computer. Different rooms in the game have different properties. Variables such as the size and speed of both the player controlled characters and the balls varies, as well as the size of the room. Video Games in 1983 described Robot War as one of the best Channel F games, calling it "simple but great".

Videocart-17
Videocart-17: Pinball Challenge is a video game released in 1978 by Fairchild. Despite the name, it is a Breakout clone.

Videocart-18
Videocart-18: Hangman is a video game released in 1976 by Fairchild.

Videocart-19
Videocart-19: Checkers is a video game released in 1980 by Fairchild.

Videocart-20
Videocart-20: Video Whizball is a video game released in 1981 by Fairchild. The goal of the game is to score points against the opponent (either the computer or another player) by sending a large floater across the opponent's goal line. As many as four floaters can be pushed across the playing field by shooting whizballs at them from the players' paddles. Players may also strategically shoot whizballs at the opponent's paddle to cause a penalty freeze. The game was given an Honorable Mention for "Best Pong Variant" in 1982 at the Third Annual Arcade Awards ("Arkies"), and it was reviewed in Video magazine's "Arcade Alley" column a month later where it was praised as "a real one-of-a-kind cartridge".

Videocart-21
Videocart-21: Bowling is a video game released in 1978 by Fairchild.

Videocart-22
Videocart-22: Slot Machine is a video game released in 1980 by Zircon. It features a slot machine that may be stopped in one of two ways. After setting the initial bet, the player may choose to either wait for a fixed period of time after which the reels come to a halt or to exert direct control by stopping each reel independently. The game was reviewed in Video magazine's "Arcade Alley" column in 1982 where its graphics were favorably described as "almost on par with [those of the] Intellivision".

Videocart-23
Videocart-23: Galactic Space Wars is a video game released in 1980 by Zircon. It contained a shoot 'em up and a Lunar Lander-style game. Video magazine reviewed the individual games in 1982, praising Galactic Space Wars inventive horizontal and vertical alignment settings, but noting that the graphics are merely "acceptable" and "can't really compete" when compared against contemporary systems. Videos review of Lunar Lander was considerably more critical, describing it as "a near-total washout" and pointing to pale images and unwieldy controls as specific problems. As a whole the cartridge was described as "a good try" confounded by "primitive technology", and readers were advised to wait for Zircon's upcoming Space Invaders-esque game, Galactic Intruders (released in 1981 as Alien Invasion).

Videocart-24
Videocart-24: Pro-Football is a video game released in 1981 by Zircon.

Videocart-25
Videocart-25: Casino Poker is a video game released in 1980 by Zircon.

Videocart-26
Videocart-26: Alien Invasion is a video game released in 1981 by Zircon.

References

External links 
List of Fairchild Channel F games on MobyGames
Home video game consoles

de:Fairchild Channel F#Spiele
es:Fairchild Channel F#juegos
it:Fairchild Channel F#Videogiochi
simple:Fairchild Channel F#List of games